Islam in Hungary has a long history that dates back to at least the 10th century. The influence of Sunni Islam was especially pronounced in the 16th century during the Ottoman period in Hungary.

History

Early history

The first Islamic author to speak of this Muslim community was Yaqut al-Hamawi (575-626 AH/1179-1229 CE), he writes about a famous Hungarian student who studied in Aleppo, according to the student there were 30 Muslim villages in Hungary. Yaqut writes in his famous geographical dictionary, "Mu'ajam al-Buldan", about his meeting with a Hungarian Muslim youth in Syria who was studying Islam there and brought some details of the history and life of their people in Hungary. The Spaniard Muslim traveler Abu Hamid al Garnati wrote of two types of Muslims in Hungary, the first being the Böszörmény of the Carpathian Basin and Volga Bulgars (Khwarezmians).

In the 11th century, St. Ladislaus and later Coloman passed laws against the non-Christians (Synod of Szabolcs). These laws subdued Islam by coercing Muslims to eat pork, go to Church, intermarry, and to forbid them from celebrating Friday. Some of Coloman's laws include:

László (Saint Ladislaus) passed the following law:

These laws discriminated severely against the small minority and eventually led to the disappearance of the community and its professions altogether.

Turkish rule of central Hungary

The Turks entered Hungary after the Battle of Mohács in 1526. From 1541, they started to control the central part directly and organized five eyalets: Budin, Kanije, Eğri, Varat (Oradea), and Temeşvar.

In the 16th century, during the Ottoman rule, numerous Muslim personalities were born in Hungary. Among them, the most important were the Ottoman Grand Vizier, Kanijeli Siyavuş Pasha (from Nagykanizsa) who held the function three times between 1582 and 1593, the Ottoman historian İbrahim Peçevi (Ibrahim of Pécs), and the famous Mevlevian dervish Pecsevi Árifi Ahmed Dede, also a Turk native of Pécs.
Most Islamic studies in Hungary were taught according to the Hanafi madhhab, or Hanafi school of thought, of Sunni Islam.

Turkish rule in the Hungarian lands ended definitively in 1699, with the signing of the Treaty of Karlowitz. The 150-year Ottoman period left behind a legacy of Turkish architecture such as mosques, türbes, and public baths (hamams), as well as changes in the local cuisine, such as the popularization of coffeehouses and the introduction of the paprika, an essential spice in Hungarian dishes.

Modern era
In the 19th century, after the collapse of the revolution of 1848-9, more than 6,000 emigrated Poles and Hungarians followed General Józef Bem (Murat Paşa) into Turkish exile. Among them were such Hungarian officers such as Richard Guyon (Kurşid Paşa), György Kmety (Ismail Paşa) and Maximilian Stein (Ferhad Paşa). These personalities were afterwards raised to the post of General.

Guyon is described in the Oxford Dictionary of National Biography as "the first Christian to obtain the rank of pasha and a Turkish military command without being obliged to change his religion", a sign of modernizing meritocracy under the 19th-century Ottomans.

The council of Újbuda has given permission for the Muslim community in Hungary to build the first Islamic centre in Budapest. The new Islamic centre will hold a library containing 50,000 volumes. 

In 2013, the Hungarian Islamic Council requested for the Grand Mufti of Bosnia and Herzegovina Husein Kavazović to also become Grand Mufti of Hungary.

Religious law
Hungary's new "Law on the Right to Freedom of Conscience and Religion, and on Churches, Religions and Religious Communities" was enacted 12 July 2011 and recognizes only 14 religious groups. Islam is not included in this list and Muslims have to apply to get official recognition under the new law. Under the law, only 14 of 358 registered churches and religious associations will be granted legal recognition, while others will have to reapply for legal registration after two-thirds approval in parliament.

On 27 February 2012, Hungary's parliament amended the country's controversial law on religious organizations by expanding the list of officially recognized organizations to include the Hungarian Islamic Council.

Demographics
According to the 2011 Hungarian census, there were 5,579 Muslims in Hungary, making up only about 0.057% of the total population. Of these, 4,097 (73.4%)  declared themselves as Hungarian, while 2,369 (42.5%) as Arab by ethnicity. In Hungary people can declare more than one ethnicity (sum is greater than the whole), Data from 2011 does not show the Turkish population (which was 1,565 in the 2001 census). However, the majority of Muslims in Hungary are of Arab or Turkish origin. Moreover, there is also a growing number of ethnic Hungarian converts to Islam.

The actual number of Muslims in Hungary is likely to be above 5,579 Muslims. Following the war in Syria, an important influx of asylum seekers arrived in 2014, 2015 and 2016 where more than 200,000 asylum applications were filed in Hungary. However from 2017 and onwards, Hungarian authorities have registered less than few hundred applications.

Notable people
Gyula Germanus, writer and politician
István Horthy Jr., physicist and architect
Ibrahim Muteferrika
İbrahim Peçevi

Gallery

See also

 Hungarian Islamic Council
 Gül Baba
 Almış (Almas) iltäbär
 Kaliz
 Islam in Romania
 Islam in Slovakia
 Turks in Hungary

References

External links

Islamic history in Hungary
History of Islam in Hungary

 

hu:Iszlám#Az iszlám Magyarországon